Mohd. Razman bin Roslan (born 14 August 1984) is a Malaysian professional footballer who currently plays for Melaka United. He mainly plays as a centre-back but can also play as a right-back.

Razman began his career with Selangor FA youth team in 1997 and later promoted to the senior team in 2005. In 2013, Razman signed with Pahang FA and featured with the club until 2015 before he returned to Selangor.

International career
In November 2010, Razman was called up to the Malaysia national team by head coach K. Rajagopal for the 2010 AFF Suzuki Cup. On 1 December 2010, he made his debut for Malaysia in a 5–1 defeat to Indonesia. Razman made two appearances during that tournament and helped his team clinch the 2010 AFF Suzuki Cup title.

Career statistics

Club

1 Includes AFC Cup and AFC Champions League.

International

Honours

Club
Selangor FA
 Malaysian Charity Shield: 2009, 2010
 Malaysian Super League: 2009, 2010
 Malaysian Premier League: 2005
 Malaysia Cup: 2005
 Malaysian FA Cup: 2005, 2009
Pahang FA
 Malaysian Cup: 2013, 2014
 Malaysian FA Cup: 2014
 Malaysian Charity Shield: 2014

International

Malaysia
 AFF Championship: 2010

References

External links
 

Living people
Malaysian footballers
Malaysia international footballers
Selangor FA players
Sri Pahang FC players
1984 births
People from Selangor
Malaysia Super League players
Association football defenders
Malaysian people of Malay descent